Ranadeb Ranjit Bose (born 27 February 1979, Kolkata, India) is an Indian first class cricketer who plays for  Bengal. A  right-arm fast-medium bowler, he took 8 wickets in the Ranji Trophy final of 2006/07 against  Mumbai. Bose finished the season with 57 wickets at an average of 14.23. He was the joint highest wicket-taker in the 2004–05 Vijay Hazare Trophy, India's domestic 50 over tournament. He holds the world record of bowling 10,708 balls in first-class and club games without overstepping.

Ranadeb attended St. Lawrence High School in Kolkata and graduated in commerce from St Xavier's College of the University of Calcutta.

Owing to his performance in the domestic season in 2006-07 he had been adjudged the Ceat Cricketer of the year in a ceremony held in Mumbai on 6 February 2007.

On 27 September 2007 Bose was named in the 'D' category of Indian cricketers, which means he officially gets Rs 15 Lakh annually and is also on the official list of national team.

References

External links
 

1979 births
Living people
Indian cricketers
Bengal cricketers
Kolkata Knight Riders cricketers
East Zone cricketers
University of Calcutta alumni
Punjab Kings cricketers
India Blue cricketers
Indian cricket coaches